, popularly known as HIME, is a Japanese mixed martial artist, currently competing in the super atomweight division of DEEP JEWELS.

Mixed martial arts career
Kawabata made her professional debut, in a 55 kilogram catchweight bout, against Kate Oyama at Deep Jewels 32 on March 7, 2021. She won the fight by unanimous decision. Although all three judges scored the bout an even 19–19 draw, the victory was awarded to Kawabata due to the Jewels ruleset.

Kawabata made her strawweight debut against Shoko Fujita at Deep Jewels 33 on June 19, 2021. She won the fight by unanimous decision, with all three judges scoring the bout 20–17 in her favor.

Kawabata faced Miki Motono in the main event of Deep Jewels 35 on December 11, 2021. She lost the fight by unanimous decision.

After suffering the first loss of her professional career, Kawabata moved down to super atomweight, in order to face the reigning Jewels atomweight and the DEEP Microweight champion Saori Oshima in a non-title bout at Deep Jewels 36 on March 12, 2022. She won the fight by unanimous decision, with scores of 20–18, 20–18 and 20–17. Following this victory, Fight Matrix ranked her as the seventh best atomweight in the world, while Sherdog ranked her as the third best atomweight in the world.

Kawabata faced Yuko Kiryu at Deep Jewels 38 on September 11, 2022. She won the fight by a first-round technical knockout, the first stoppage victory of her professional career.

Kawabata was booked to face Machi Fukuda at Deep Jewels 40 on February 18, 2023. She lost the fight by a first-round submission.

Mixed martial arts record

 
|-
| Loss
| align=center|4–2
| Machi Fukuda
| Submission (rear-naked choked)
| Deep Jewels 40
| 
| align=center| 1
| align=center| 4:55
| Tokyo, Japan
| 
|-
| Win
| align=center|4–1
| Yuko Kiryu
| TKO (punches)
| Deep Jewels 38
| 
| align=center| 1
| align=center|0:37
| Tokyo, Japan
| 
|-
| Win
| align=center| 3–1
| Saori Oshima
| Decision (unanimous)
| Deep Jewels 36
| 
| align=center| 2
| align=center| 5:00
| Tokyo, Japan
| 
|-
| Loss
| align=center| 2–1
| Miki Motono
| Decision (unanimous)
| Deep Jewels 35
| 
| align=center| 2
| align=center| 5:00
| Tokyo, Japan
| 
|-
| Win
| align=center| 2–0
| Shoko Fujita
| Decision (unanimous)
| Deep Jewels 33
| 
| align=center| 2
| align=center| 5:00
| Tokyo, Japan
| 
|-
| Win
| align=center| 1–0
| Kate Oyama
| Decision (unanimous)
| Deep Jewels 32
| 
| align=center| 2
| align=center| 5:00
| Tokyo, Japan
| 
|-

|-
|Loss
|align=center|0-1
|Mayu Kawanishi
|Decision (Unanimous)
|Deep Jewels 27
|
|align=center|2
|align=center|3:00
|Osaka, Japan
|
|-
|}

See also
 List of female mixed martial artists

References

Japanese female mixed martial artists
Living people
Atomweight mixed martial artists
Sportspeople from Ishikawa Prefecture
1987 births
21st-century Japanese women